Kingsford is a large hamlet in Worcestershire, England.

Location
Kingsford is located one mile (1.6 km) north of the village of Wolverley, Worcestershire, to the north of Kidderminster. It is the northernmost settlement in the county, forming part of the border with Staffordshire and is 2 miles southwest of Kinver.

History and amenities

Kingsford was a separate manor from the rest of Wolverley, and was formerly in the hundred of Halfshire, whereas the rest of the parish was in Oswaldslow.

Adjacent to Kingsford is Kingsford Country Park. The park comprises  and has many woodland and forest walks named after woodland birds such as the Robin Trail, Nuthatch Trail etc.
The Worcestershire Way waymarked long-distance footpath passes through the park. Kinver Edge adjoins the country park on its north.

References

External links

Kingsford Country Park info from Worcestershire County Council

Hamlets in Worcestershire